The 1978 Akron Zips football team represented Akron University in the 1978 NCAA Division II football season as a member of the Mid-Continent Conference. Led by sixth-year head coach Jim Dennison, the Zips played their home games at the Rubber Bowl in Akron, Ohio. They finished the season with a record of 6–5 overall and 4–1 in MCC play, placing second.

Schedule

References

Akron
Akron Zips football seasons
Akron Zips football